Remlingen-Semmenstedt is a municipality in the district of Wolfenbüttel, in Lower Saxony, Germany. It was formed on 1 November 2016 by the merger of the former municipalities Remlingen and Semmenstedt.

Five villages belong to the municipality (population 2022): 
 Remlingen (1282)
 Semmenstedt (482)
 Groß Biewende (295)
 Klein Biewende (200)
 Timmern (172)

References

Wolfenbüttel (district)